Deh Sam-e Ludab (also Romanized as Deh Sam-e Lūdāb; also known as Deh-e Sam, Deh Sam, and Deh Som) is a village in Ludab Rural District, Ludab District, Boyer-Ahmad County, Kohgiluyeh and Boyer-Ahmad Province, Iran. At the 2006 census, its population was 85, in 16 families.

References 

Populated places in Boyer-Ahmad County